Torregiani is an Italian surname. Notable people with the surname include:

Bartolommeo Torregiani (died c. 1674), Italian painter
Luigi Maria Torreggiani (1697–1777), Italian Roman Catholic cardinal
Vincenzo Torregiani (1742–1770), Italian painter

Italian-language surnames